International business development evolves through the normal processes of trade, foreign direct investment, capital flows, migration, and the advancement of technology in undeveloped nations.  In order to achieve sustainable global business development, business professionals often must find ways of adapting to the cultures and societies within which they operate and conduct business. With huge growth opportunities created by the emerging middle class of nations such as Brazil, Russia, India, China and South Africa (the BRICS countries), many companies in the developed world are stepping in to provide goods and services to those countries' consumers, and business development professionals provide the necessary legal, financial, and cultural bridges between supplier and consumer.

As the globalization of economies, societies, and cultures continues, and nations become more integrated through networks of exchange, international business development and global strategic management continues to evolve. Global firms that employ business development professionals in multiple locations who share exactly the same body of knowledge, ethics, practices, and standards benefit from a shared body of knowledge and ethics.  These companies are well positioned for growth, as are the societies in which they operate.

Professionals who work in international business development (as distinct from domestic, or intra-national efforts) must acquire specific skills relating to the countries where they operate. This includes understanding the economy, history, culture, laws, business practices and trade patterns of the target country. It also includes a broader understanding of issues common to any international work: global travel, risk mitigation, international contracts and more. Most companies new to international business development, or new to a geography engage the help of third-party consulting firms who specialize in either cross cultural work or in a particular country. Some governments also offer support in this area to their companies that seek to create jobs in their country, by promoting exports.

The international business development and global strategic management industry is a specialized field of commerce that penetrates existing markets, and often creates new ones, by introducing new products and services to businesses, individuals, non-profit organizations, and government agencies.

Topics that are common to international business development include ethics, philosophy, economics, politics, marketing, management, and technology.  International business development professionals require knowledge of the legalities of strategic relationships, licensing, partnering, intellectual property, emerging technologies, fair practices, cultural differences, international marketing, information management, knowledge management, finance, and advertising, all of which affect business development within a culture and its economy. Specific projects that international business development professionals are often tasked with include devising merger/acquisition strategies, identification and vetting of target companies, developing strategic rationale for transactions, ensuring regulatory compliance, and assisting with cross-cultural communications.

See also
BRICS
Emerging markets
Next Eleven
International marketing

References

External links
 International Business Development Institute

Business process